Deepwater Township is a township in Henry County, in the U.S. state of Missouri.

Deepwater Township was established in 1840, taking its name from Deepwater Creek.

References

Townships in Missouri
Townships in Henry County, Missouri